Frank Sotonoma "Grey Wolf" Salsedo (May 20, 1929 – July 3, 2009) was a Native American actor.  He was often cast in smaller parts centered on his Native American heritage.

As an actor, Salsedo has performed in movies such as The Ghost Dance, released in 1980 in which he played Ocacio, Magic in the Water (1995) playing Uncle Kipper, Across the Great Divide (1976) in which he played Mosa, Creepshow 2 (1987) in which he played Ben Whitemoon (segment: Old Chief Wood'nhead), Journey to Spirit Island (1988) as Hoots and Best of the Best 2 (1993) in which he played Charlie. and he had a recurring role as White Eagle in ‘’Walker Texas Ranger’’.

Early life and education
Frank Sotonoma Salsedo was born on May 20, 1929 in Santa Rosa, California to Gilbert and Helen Salsedo.  He had five brothers (Delano, Lovedale Richard, Gilbert, Hal and Kenny) and six sisters (Helen Rose, Jane, Lola, Gertrude, Vera and Donna).  He graduated from the Sherman Institute and then enlisted in the United States Navy. After his discharge he became a CPA and graduated from Sawyer's Business College.

Career
Salsedo was the President of Jay Silverheels Acting School in Los Angeles, where he found his dream job as an actor.  As a member of the Screen Actors Guild he made over 50 movies and helped other Native Americans in the film industry.

He portrayed the role of White Bird in the 1975 television movie, I Will Fight No More Forever.  Salsedo appeared in one episode of the short-lived 1977 series, Code R.  One of his earliest roles in film was as Ocacio in The Ghost Dance (1980).

Salsedo played Charlie in Best of the Best 2 (1993).  In 1995, Salsedo played Uncle Kipper in Magic in the Water.  The next year, he portrayed Nakki in North Star (1996), opposite James Caan.  In  1998, he appeared alongside Chris Farley and Matthew Perry in Almost Heroes.  He appeared in six episodes of Walker, Texas Ranger.

Personal life and death
Salsedo was the hereditary chief of the Wappo tribe of Sonoma County, California.  At the time of his death, Salsedo, along with the Mishewal Wappo Tribe, was involved in a federal recognition lawsuit.

Salsedo was married to Leta Stephens and they had two daughters, Lynette and Eugenia, and two sons, Ramon and Rick.  He was preceded in death by his parents, his brother Delano, his sister Helen Rose Hageman and his wife.

In addition to his alias, "Grey Wolf", Salsedo also had an additional nickname, "Beverly Hills".

Salsedo died on July 3, 2009 in Manteca, California at the age of 80.  He is survived by: his sisters Jane Couey, Lola Garcia, Gertrude Merrifield, Vera Guillory, Donna Walters; brothers Lovedale Richard, Gilbert, Hal, and Kenny Salsedo; children Lynnette Holmes, Ramon, Rick, and Eugenia Salsedo; grandchildren Mario Reno, Jasmine and Ryan Salsedo, Nicholas Noah; great-grandchildren Kailynn and Quinn Reno; nieces, nephews, and cousins.

Filmography

Film

Television

References

External links

2009 deaths
1929 births
Native American male actors
American male film actors
American male television actors
20th-century American male actors
Wappo